Colubrina californica, also known as Las Animas nakedwood, is a species of shrub in the family Rhamnaceae.

Distribution and habitat
It is native to the Sonoran Desert of the southwestern United States (in California, Nevada, and Arizona) and northern Mexico, where it grows in desert scrub habitat.

Description
The thorny shrub has deciduous leaves, oval in shape and coated in silky hairs. The inflorescence is a dense cluster of several tiny nectar-filled flowers. It blooms in April and May after the ground is moistened with rain.

References

External links
Jepson Manual Treatment
USDA Plants Profile
Photo gallery

californica
North American desert flora